The Erie Canal is a historic canal in upstate New York that runs east-west between the Hudson River and Lake Erie. Completed in 1825, the canal was the first navigable waterway connecting the Atlantic Ocean to the Great Lakes, vastly reducing the costs of transporting people and goods across the Appalachians. In effect, the canal accelerated the settlement of the Great Lakes region, the westward expansion of the United States, and the economic ascendancy of New York State. It has been called "The Nation's First Superhighway."

A canal from the Hudson to the Great Lakes was first proposed in the 1780s, but a formal survey was not conducted until 1808. The New York State Legislature authorized construction in 1817. Political opponents of the canal, and of its lead supporter New York Governor DeWitt Clinton, denigrated the project as "Clinton's Folly" and "Clinton's Big Ditch". Nonetheless, the canal saw quick success upon opening on October 26, 1825, with toll revenue covering the state's construction debt within the first year of operation. The westward connection gave New York City a strong advantage over all other U.S. ports and brought major growth to canal cities such as Albany, Utica, Syracuse, Rochester, and Buffalo.

The construction of the Erie Canal was a landmark civil engineering achievement in the early history of the United States. When built, the  canal was the second-longest in the world (after the Grand Canal in China). It has 34 locks, including the Waterford Flight, the steepest locks in the United States. When leaving the canal, boats must also traverse the Black Rock Lock to reach Lake Erie or the Troy Federal Lock to reach the tidal Hudson.

The Erie's peak year was 1855, when 33,000 commercial shipments took place. It continued to be competitive with railroads until about 1902, when tolls were abolished. Commercial traffic declined heavily in the latter half of the 20th century due to competition from trucking and the 1959 opening of the larger St. Lawrence Seaway. The canal's last regularly scheduled hauler, the Day Peckinpaugh, ended service in 1994.

Today, the Erie Canal is mainly used by recreational watercraft. It connects the three other canals in the New York State Canal System: the Champlain, Oswego, and Cayuga–Seneca. Some long-distance boaters take the Erie as part of the Great Loop. The canal has also become a tourist attraction in its own right—a number of parks and museums are dedicated to its history. The Erie Canalway Trail is a popular cycling path that follows the canal across the state. In 2000, Congress designated the Erie Canalway National Heritage Corridor to protect and promote the system.

Ambiguity in name
The waterway today referred to as the Erie Canal is quite different from the nineteenth-century Erie Canal. More than half of the original Erie Canal was destroyed or abandoned during construction of the New York State Barge Canal in the early 20th century. The sections of the original route remaining in use were widened significantly, mostly west of Syracuse, with bridges rebuilt and locks replaced. It was called the Barge Canal at the time, but that name fell into disuse with the disappearance of commercial traffic and the increase of recreational travel in the later 20th century.

History

Background

Prior to the advent of railroads, water transport was the most cost-effective way to ship bulk goods.

In the early years of the United States, transportation of goods between the coastal ports and the interior was slow and difficult. Close to the seacoast, rivers provided easy inland transport up to the fall line, since floating vessels encounter much less friction than land vehicles.  However, the Appalachian Mountains were a great obstacle to further transportation or settlement, stretching  from Maine to Alabama, with just five places where mule trains or wagon roads could be routed. Passengers and freight bound for the western parts of the country had to travel overland, a journey made more difficult by the rough condition of the roads. In 1800, it typically took 2½ weeks to travel overland from New York to Cleveland, Ohio, and 4 weeks to Detroit.

The principal exportable product of the Ohio Valley was grain, which was a high-volume, low-priced commodity, bolstered by supplies from the coast. Frequently it was not worth the cost of transporting it to far-away population centers. This was a factor leading to farmers in the west turning their grains into whiskey for easier transport and higher sales, and later the Whiskey Rebellion. In the 18th and early 19th centuries, it became clear to coastal residents that the city or state that succeeded in developing a cheap, reliable route to the West would enjoy economic success, and the port at the seaward end of such a route would see business increase greatly. In time, projects were devised in Virginia, Maryland, Pennsylvania, and relatively deep into the coastal states.

Topography

The Mohawk River (a tributary of the Hudson River) rises near Lake Ontario and runs in a glacial meltwater channel just north of the Catskill range of the Appalachian Mountains, separating them from the geologically distinct Adirondacks to the north. The Mohawk and Hudson valleys form the only cut across the Appalachians north of Alabama.  A navigable canal through the Mohawk Valley would allow an almost complete water route from New York City in the south to Lake Ontario and Lake Erie in the west. Via the canal and these lakes, other Great Lakes, and to a lesser degree, related rivers, a large part of the continent's interior (and many settlements) would be made well connected to the Eastern seaboard.

Proposals

The idea of a canal to tie the East Coast to the new western settlements was discussed as early as 1724: New York provincial official Cadwallader Colden made a passing reference (in a report on fur trading) to improving the natural waterways of western New York.

Gouverneur Morris and Elkanah Watson were early proponents of a canal along the Mohawk River. Their efforts led to the creation of the "Western and Northern Inland Lock Navigation Companies" in 1792, which took the first steps to improve navigation on the Mohawk and construct a canal between the Mohawk and Lake Ontario, but it was soon discovered that private financing was insufficient.
Christopher Colles (who was familiar with the Bridgewater Canal) surveyed the Mohawk Valley, and made a presentation to the New York state legislature in 1784, proposing a shorter canal from Lake Ontario. The proposal drew attention and some action but was never implemented.

Jesse Hawley had envisioned encouraging the growing of large quantities of grain on the western New York plains (then largely unsettled) for sale on the Eastern seaboard. However, he went bankrupt trying to ship grain to the coast. While in Canandaigua debtors' prison, Hawley began pressing for the construction of a canal along the -long Mohawk River valley with support from Joseph Ellicott (agent for the Holland Land Company in Batavia). Ellicott realized that a canal would add value to the land he was selling in the western part of the state. He later became the first canal commissioner.

New York legislators became interested in the possibility of building a canal across New York in the first decade of the 19th century. Shipping goods west from Albany was a costly and tedious affair; there was no railroad yet, and to cover the distance from Buffalo to New York City by stagecoach took two weeks. Such a canal would be expensive to build even with modern technology; in 1800, the expense was barely imaginable. President Thomas Jefferson called it "little short of madness" and rejected it.

Eventually, Hawley interested New York Governor DeWitt Clinton in the project. There was much opposition, and the project was ridiculed as "Clinton's folly" and "Clinton's ditch". In 1817, though, Clinton received approval from the legislature for $7 million for construction.

Construction

Its construction, through limestone and mountains, proved a daunting task. To move earth, animals pulled a "slip scraper" (similar to a bulldozer). The sides of the canal were lined with stone set in clay, and the bottom was also lined with clay. The Canal was built by Irish laborers and German stonemasons. All labor on the canal depended upon human and animal power or the force of water. As the canal progressed, the crews and engineers working on the project developed expertise and became a skilled labor force.

The men who planned and oversaw construction were novices as surveyors and as engineers. There were no civil engineers in the United States. James Geddes and Benjamin Wright, who laid out the route, were judges whose experience in surveying was in settling boundary disputes. Geddes had only used a surveying instrument for a few hours before his work on the Canal. Canvass White was a 27-year-old amateur engineer who persuaded Clinton to let him go to Britain at his own expense to study the canal system there. Nathan Roberts was a mathematics teacher and land speculator. Yet these men "carried the Erie Canal up the Niagara escarpment at Lockport, maneuvered it onto a towering embankment to cross over Irondequoit Creek, spanned the Genesee River on an awesome aqueduct, and carved a route for it out of the solid rock between Little Falls and Schenectady—and all of those venturesome designs worked precisely as planned".

Construction began on July 4, 1817, at Rome, New York. The first , from Rome to Utica, opened in 1819. At that rate, the canal would not be finished for 30 years. The main delays were caused by felling trees to clear a path through virgin forest and moving excavated soil, which took longer than expected, but the builders devised ways to solve these problems. To fell a tree, they threw rope over the top branches and winched it down. They pulled out the stumps with an innovative stump puller. Two huge wheels were mounted loose on the ends of an axle. A third wheel, slightly smaller than the others, was fixed to the center of the axle. A chain was wrapped around the axle and hooked to the stump. A rope was wrapped around the center wheel and hooked to a team of oxen. The mechanical advantage (torque) obtained ripped the stumps out of the soil. Soil to be moved was shoveled into large wheelbarrows that were dumped into mule-pulled carts. Using a scraper and a plow, a three-man team with oxen, horses and mules could build a mile in a year.

The remaining problem was finding labor; increased immigration helped fill the need. Many of the laborers working on the canal were Irish, who had recently come to the United States as a group of about 5,000. Most of them were Roman Catholic, a religion that raised much suspicion in early America because of its hierarchic structure, and many laborers on the canal suffered violent assault as the result of misjudgment and xenophobia.

Construction continued at an increased rate as new workers arrived. When the canal reached Montezuma Marsh (at the outlet of Cayuga Lake west of Syracuse), it was rumored that over 1,000 workers died of "swamp fever" (malaria), and construction was temporarily stopped. However, recent research has revealed that the death toll was likely much lower, as no contemporary reports mention significant worker mortality, and mass graves from the period have never been found in the area. Work continued on the downhill side towards the Hudson, and the crews worked on the section across the swampland when it froze in winter.

The middle section from Utica to Salina (Syracuse) was completed in 1820, and traffic on that section started up immediately. Expansion to the east and west proceeded simultaneously, and the whole eastern section,  from Brockport to Albany, opened on September 10, 1823, to great fanfare.

After Montezuma Marsh, the next difficulties were crossing Irondequoit Creek and the Genesee River near Rochester.

In 1823 construction reached the Niagara Escarpment, an -high wall of hard dolomitic limestone. The route followed the channel of a creek that had cut a ravine steeply down the escarpment. The construction and operation of two sets of five locks along a  corridor soon gave rise to the community of Lockport. Much of that section was blasted with black powder, and the inexperience of the crews often led to accidents, and sometimes to rocks falling on nearby homes.

Two villages competed to be the terminus: Black Rock, on the Niagara River, and Buffalo, at the eastern tip of Lake Erie. Buffalo expended great energy to widen and deepen Buffalo Creek to make it navigable and to create a harbor at its mouth. Buffalo won over Black Rock, and grew into a large city, eventually encompassing its former rival.

Completion

In 1824, before the canal was completed, a detailed Pocket Guide for the Tourist and Traveler, Along the Line of the Canals, and the Interior Commerce of the State of New York, was published for the benefit of travelers and land speculators.

The entire canal was officially completed on October 26, 1825. The event was marked by a statewide "Grand Celebration," culminating in a series of cannon shots along the length of the canal and the Hudson, a 90-minute cannonade from Buffalo to New York City. A flotilla of boats, led by Governor Dewitt Clinton aboard Seneca Chief, sailed from Buffalo to New York City over ten days. Clinton then ceremonially poured Lake Erie water into New York Harbor to mark the "Wedding of the Waters". On its return trip, Seneca Chief brought back a keg of Atlantic Ocean water, which was poured into Lake Erie by Buffalo's Judge Samuel Wilkeson, who would later become mayor.

It was acclaimed as an engineering marvel that united the country and helped New York City develop as an international trade center.

Problems developed but were quickly solved. Leaks developed along the entire length of the canal, but these were sealed using cement that hardened underwater (hydraulic cement).

Branch canals

Additional feeder canals soon extended the Erie Canal into a system. These included the Cayuga-Seneca Canal south to the Finger Lakes, the Oswego Canal from Three Rivers north to Lake Ontario at Oswego, and the Champlain Canal from Troy north to Lake Champlain. From 1833 to 1877, the short Crooked Lake Canal connected Keuka Lake and Seneca Lake. The Chemung Canal connected the south end of Seneca Lake to Elmira in 1833, and was an important route for Pennsylvania coal and timber into the canal system. The Chenango Canal in 1836 connected the Erie Canal at Utica to Binghamton and caused a business boom in the Chenango River valley. The Chenango and Chemung canals linked the Erie with the Susquehanna River system. The Black River Canal connected the Black River to the Erie Canal at Rome and remained in operation until the 1920s. The Genesee Valley Canal was run along the Genesee River to connect with the Allegheny River at Olean, but the Allegheny section, which would have connected to the Ohio and Mississippi rivers, was never built. The Genesee Valley Canal was later abandoned and became the route of the Genesee Valley Canal Railroad.

First Enlargement

The original design planned for an annual tonnage of 1.5 million tons (1.36 million metric tons), but this was exceeded immediately. An ambitious program to improve the canal began in 1834. Locks were widened and/or rebuilt in new locations, and many new navigable aqueducts were constructed. The canal was straightened and slightly re-routed in some stretches, resulting in the abandonment of short segments of the original 1825 canal. The First Enlargement was completed in 1862, with further minor enlargements in later decades.

Railroad competition

The Mohawk and Hudson Railroad opened in 1837, providing a bypass to the slowest part of the canal between Albany and Schenectady. Other railroads were soon chartered and built to continue the line west to Buffalo, and in 1842 a continuous line (which later became the New York Central Railroad and its Auburn Road in 1853) was open the whole way to Buffalo. As the railroad served the same general route as the canal, but provided for faster travel, passengers soon switched to it. However, as late as 1852, the canal carried thirteen times more freight tonnage than all the railroads in New York State combined. The New York, West Shore and Buffalo Railway was completed in 1884, as a route running closely parallel to both the canal and the New York Central Railroad. However, it went bankrupt and was acquired the next year by the New York Central. The canal continued to compete well with the railroads through 1902, when tolls were abolished.

Barge Canal

In 1903 the New York State legislature authorized construction of the New York State Barge Canal as the "Improvement of the Erie, the Oswego, the Champlain, and the Cayuga and Seneca Canals".
In 1905, construction of the Barge Canal began, which was completed in 1918, at a cost of $96.7 million.

This new canal replaced much of the original route, leaving many abandoned sections (most notably between Syracuse and Rome). New digging and flood control technologies allowed engineers to canalize rivers that the original canal had sought to avoid, such as the Mohawk, Seneca, and Clyde rivers, and Oneida Lake. This expensive project was politically unpopular in parts of the state not served by the canal, and failed to save it from becoming obsolete for commercial shipping.

Commercial decline

Freight traffic reached a total of 5.2 million short tons (4.7 million metric tons) by 1951. The growth of railroads and highways across the state, and the opening of the St. Lawrence Seaway in 1959, caused commercial traffic on the canal to decline dramatically during the second half of the 20th century. Since the 1990s, the canal system has been used primarily by recreational traffic.

New York State Canal System

In 1992, the New York State Barge Canal was renamed the New York State Canal System (including the Erie, Cayuga-Seneca, Oswego, and Champlain canals) and placed under the newly created New York State Canal Corporation, a subsidiary of the New York State Thruway Authority. While part of the Thruway, the canal system was operated using money generated by Thruway tolls. In 2017, the New York State Canal Corporation was transferred from the New York State Thruway to the New York Power Authority.

In 2000, Congress designated the Erie Canalway National Heritage Corridor, covering  of navigable water from Lake Champlain to the Capital Region and west to Buffalo. The area has a population of 2.7 million; about 75% of Central and Western New York's population lives within  of the Erie Canal.

There were some 42 commercial shipments on the canal in 2008, compared to 15 such shipments in 2007 and more than 33,000 shipments in 1855, the canal's peak year. The new growth in commercial traffic is due to the rising cost of diesel fuel. Canal barges can carry a short ton of cargo  on one gallon of diesel fuel, while a gallon allows a train to haul the same amount of cargo  and a truck . In 2012, the New York State Canal System as a whole was used to ship 42,000 tons of cargo.

Travel on the canal's middle section (particularly in the Mohawk Valley) was severely hampered by flooding in late June and early July 2006. Flood damage to the canal and its facilities was estimated as at least $15 million.

Route

Original Canal
{
  "type": "ExternalData",
  "service": "page",
  "title": "Original Erie Canal.map"
}
The Erie made use of the favorable conditions of New York's unique topography, which provided that area with the only break in the Appalachians south of the St. Lawrence River. The Hudson is tidal to Troy, and Albany is west of the Appalachians. It allowed for east–west navigation from the coast to the Great Lakes within US territory.

The canal began on the west side of the Hudson River at Albany, and ran north to Watervliet, where the Champlain Canal branched off. At Cohoes, it climbed the escarpment on the west side of the Hudson River—16 locks rising —and then turned west along the south shore of the Mohawk River, crossing to the north side at Crescent and again to the south at Rexford. The canal continued west near the south shore of the Mohawk River all the way to Rome, where the Mohawk turns north.

At Rome, the canal continued west parallel to Wood Creek, which flows westward into Oneida Lake, and turned southwest and west cross-country to avoid the lake. From Canastota west, it ran roughly along the north (lower) edge of the Onondaga Escarpment, passing through Syracuse, Onondaga Lake, and Rochester. Before reaching Rochester, the canal uses a series of natural ridges to cross the deep valley of Irondequoit Creek. At Lockport the canal turned southwest to rise to the top of the Niagara Escarpment, using the ravine of Eighteen Mile Creek.

The canal continued south-southwest to Pendleton, where it turned west and southwest, mainly using the channel of Tonawanda Creek. From the Tonawanda south toward Buffalo, it ran just east of the Niagara River, where it reached its "Western Terminus" at Little Buffalo Creek (later it became the Commercial Slip), which discharged into the Buffalo River just above its confluence with Lake Erie. With Buffalo's re-excavation of the Commercial Slip, completed in 2008, the Canal's original terminus is now re-watered and again accessible by boats. With several miles of the Canal inland of this location still lying under 20th-century fill and urban construction, the effective western navigable terminus of the Erie Canal is found at Tonawanda.

Barge Canal

The new alignment began on the Hudson River at the border between Cohoes and Waterford, where it ran northwest with five locks (the so-called "Waterford Flight"), running into the Mohawk River east of Crescent. The Waterford Flight is claimed to be one of the steepest series of locks in the world.

While the old Canal ran next to the Mohawk all the way to Rome, the new canal ran through the river, which was straightened or widened where necessary. At Ilion, the new canal left the river for good, but continued to run on a new alignment parallel to both the river and the old canal to Rome. From Rome, the new route continued almost due west, merging with Fish Creek just east of its entry into Oneida Lake.

From Oneida Lake, the new canal ran west along the Oneida River, with cutoffs to shorten the route. At Three Rivers, the Oneida River turns northwest, and was deepened for the Oswego Canal to Lake Ontario. The new Erie Canal turned south there along the Seneca River, which turns west near Syracuse and continues west to a point in the Montezuma Marsh. There the Cayuga and Seneca Canal continued south with the Seneca River, and the new Erie Canal again ran parallel to the old canal along the bottom of the Niagara Escarpment, in some places running along the Clyde River, and in some places replacing the old canal. At Pittsford, southeast of Rochester, the canal turned west to run around the south side of Rochester, rather than through downtown. The canal crosses the Genesee River at the Genesee Valley Park, then rejoins the old path near North Gates.

From there it was again roughly an upgrade to the original canal, running west to Lockport. Diversions from and to adjacent natural streams along the way are used to maintain the canal's level. It runs southwest to Tonawanda, where the new alignment discharges into the Niagara River, which is navigable upstream to the New York Barge Canal's Black Rock Lock and thence to the Canal's original "Western Terminus" at Buffalo's Inner Harbor.

Operations

Freight boats

The canal had one towpath, generally on the north side. When canal boats met, the boat with the right of way remained on the towpath side of the canal. The other boat steered toward the berm (or heelpath) side of the canal. The driver (or "hoggee", pronounced HO-gee) of the privileged boat kept his towpath team by the canalside edge of the towpath, while the hoggee of the other boat moved to the outside of the towpath and stopped his team. His towline would be unhitched from the horses, go slack, fall into the water and sink to the bottom, while his boat coasted with its remaining momentum. The privileged boat's team would step over the other boat's towline, with its horses pulling the boat over the sunken towline without stopping. Once clear, the other boat's team would continue on its way.

Pulled by teams of horses, canal boats moved slowly, but methodically, shrinking time and distance. Efficiently, the smooth, nonstop method of transportation cut the travel time between Albany and Buffalo nearly in half, moving by day and by night. Migrants took passage on freight boats, camping on deck or on top of crates.

Passenger boats

The best examples, furnished with carpeted floors, stuffed chairs, and mahogany tables stocked with books and current newspapers, served as sitting rooms during the days. At mealtimes, crews transformed the cabin into a dining room. Drawing a curtain across the width of the room divided the cabin into ladies' and gentlemen's sleeping quarters at night. Pull-down tiered beds folded from the walls, and additional cots could be hung from hooks in the ceiling. Some captains hired musicians and held dances.

Sunday closing debate
The New York State Legislature debated closing the locks of the Erie Canal on Sundays, when they convened in 1858. However, George Jeremiah and Dwight Bacheller, two of the bill's opponents, argued that the state had no right to stop canal traffic on the grounds that the Erie Canal and its tributaries had ceased to be wards of the state. The canal at its inception had been imagined as an extension of nature, an artificial river where there had been none. The canal succeeded by sharing more in common with lakes and seas than it had with public roads. Jeremiah and Bacheller argued, successfully, that just as it was unthinkable to halt oceangoing navigation on Sunday, so it was with the canal.

Impact

Economic impact 

The Erie Canal greatly lowered the cost of shipping between the Midwest and the Northeast, bringing much lower food costs to Eastern cities and allowing the East to economically ship machinery and manufactured goods to the Midwest. To give an example, the cost to transport barrel of flour from Rochester to Albany dropped from $3 (before the canal) to 75¢ on the canal. The canal also made an immense contribution to the wealth and importance of New York City, Buffalo and New York State. Its impact went much further, increasing trade throughout the nation by opening eastern and overseas markets to Midwestern farm products and by enabling migration to the West. The port of New York became essentially the Atlantic home port for all of the Midwest. Because of this vital connection and others to follow, such as the railroads, New York would become known as the "Empire State" or "the great Empire State".

The Erie Canal was an immediate success. Tolls collected on freight had already exceeded the state's construction debt in its first year of official operation. By 1828, import duties collected at the New York Customs House supported federal government operations and provided funds for all the expenses in Washington except the interest on the national debt. Additionally, New York State's initial loan for the original canal had been paid by 1837. Although it had been envisioned as primarily a commercial channel for freight boats, passengers also traveled on the canal's packet boats. In 1825 more than 40,000 passengers took advantage of the convenience and beauty of canal travel. The canal's steady flow of tourists, businessmen and settlers lent it to uses never imagined by its initial sponsors. Evangelical preachers made their circuits of the upstate region, and the canal served as the last leg of the Underground Railroad ferrying runaway slaves to Buffalo near the Canada–US border. Aspiring merchants found that tourists were reliable customers. Vendors moved from boat to boat peddling items such as books, watches and fruit, while less scrupulous "confidence men" sold remedies for foot corns or passed off counterfeit bills. Tourists were carried along the "northern tour," which ultimately led to the popular honeymoon destination Niagara Falls, just north of Buffalo.

As the canal brought travelers to New York City, it took business away from other ports such as Philadelphia and Baltimore. Those cities and their states started projects to compete with the Erie Canal. In Pennsylvania, the Main Line of Public Works was a combined canal and railroad running west from Philadelphia to Pittsburgh on the Ohio River, opened in 1834. In Maryland, the Baltimore and Ohio Railroad ran west to Wheeling, West Virginia, then a part of Virginia, also on the Ohio River, and was completed in 1853.

The canal played a major role in the growth of Standard Oil, as founder John D. Rockefeller used the canal as a cheaper form of transportation – in the summer months when it was not frozen – to get his refined oil from Cleveland to New York City. In the winter months his only options were the three trunk lines: the Erie Railroad, the New York Central Railroad, or the Pennsylvania Railroad.

Migratory impact 
New ethnic Irish communities formed in some towns along its route after completion, as Irish immigrants were a large portion of the construction labor force. A plaque honoring the canal's construction is located in Battery Park in southern Manhattan.

Because so many immigrants traveled on the canal, many genealogists have sought copies of canal passenger lists. Apart from the years 1827–1829, canal boat operators were not required to record passenger names or report them to the New York government. Some passenger lists survive today in the New York State Archives, and other sources of traveler information are sometimes available.

The canal allowed Buffalo to grow from just 200 settlers in 1820 to more than 18,000 people by 1840.

Cultural impact 

The Canal also helped bind the still-new nation closer to Britain and Europe. Repeal of Britain's Corn Law resulted in a huge increase in exports of Midwestern wheat to Britain. Trade between the United States and Canada also increased as a result of the repeal and a reciprocity (free-trade) agreement signed in 1854. Much of this trade flowed along the Erie.

Its success also prompted imitation: a rash of canal-building followed. Also, the many technical hurdles that had to be overcome made heroes of those whose innovations made the canal possible. This led to an increased public esteem for practical education. Chicago, among other Great Lakes cities, recognized the importance of the canal to its economy, and two West Loop streets are named "Canal" and "Clinton" (for canal proponent DeWitt Clinton).

Concern that erosion caused by logging in the Adirondacks could silt up the canal contributed to the creation in 1885 of another New York National Historic Landmark, the Adirondack Park.

Many notable authors wrote about the canal, including Herman Melville, Frances Trollope, Nathaniel Hawthorne, Harriet Beecher Stowe, Mark Twain, Samuel Hopkins Adams and the Marquis de Lafayette, and many tales and songs were written about life on the canal. The popular song "Low Bridge, Everybody Down" by Thomas S. Allen was written in 1905 to memorialize the canal's early heyday, when barges were pulled by mules rather than engines.

Consisting of a massive stone aqueduct that carried boats over incredible cascades, Little Falls was one of the most popular stops for American and foreign tourists. This is shown in Scene 4 of William Dunlap's play A Trip to Niagara, where he depicts the general preference of tourists to travel by canal so that they could experience a combination of artificial and natural sights. Canal travel was, for many, an opportunity to take in the sublime and commune with nature. The play also reflects the less enthusiastic view of some who saw movement on the canal as tedious.

The Erie Canal changed property law in New York. Most importantly, it expanded the government's right to take private property. Cases surrounding the newly built Erie Canal expanded condemnation theory to permit canal builders to appropriate private land and broadened the meaning of "public use" in the 5th Amendment to the U.S. Constitution. The canal also had an impact on water access jurisprudence as well as nuisance law.

The canal today

Today, the Erie Canal is used primarily by recreational vessels, though it remains served by several commercial barge-towing companies.

The canal is open to small craft and some larger vessels from May through November each year. During winter, water is drained from parts of the canal for maintenance. The Champlain Canal, Lake Champlain, and the Chambly Canal, and Richelieu River in Canada form the Lakes to Locks Passage, making a tourist attraction of the former waterway linking eastern Canada to the Erie Canal. In 2006 recreational boating fees were eliminated to attract more visitors.

The Erie Canal is a destination for tourists from all over the world, and has inspired guidebooks dedicated to exploration of the waterway. An Erie Canal Cruise company, based in Herkimer, operates from mid-May until mid-October with daily cruises. The cruise goes through the history of the canal and also takes passengers through Lock 18.

Aside from transportation, numerous businesses, farms, factories and communities alongside its banks still utilize the canal's waters for other purposes such as irrigation for farmland, hydroelectricity, research, industry, and even drinking. Use of the canal system has an estimated total economic impact of $6.2 billion annually.

Old Erie Canal

Today, the reconfiguration of the canal created during the First Enlargement is commonly referred to as the "Improved Erie Canal" or the "Old Erie Canal", to distinguish it from the canal's modern-day course. Existing remains of the 1825 canal abandoned during the Enlargement are officially referred to today as "Clinton's Ditch" (which was also the popular nickname for the entire Erie Canal project during its original 1817–1825 construction).

Sections of the Old Erie Canal not used after 1918 are owned by New York State, or have been ceded to or purchased by counties or municipalities. Many stretches of the old canal have been filled in to create roads such as Erie Boulevard in Syracuse and Schenectady, and Broad Street and the Rochester Subway in Rochester. A 36‑mile (58 km) stretch of the old canal from the town of DeWitt, New York, east of Syracuse, to just outside Rome, New York, is preserved as the Old Erie Canal State Historic Park. In 1960 the Schoharie Crossing State Historic Site, a section of the canal in Montgomery County, was one of the first sites recognized as a National Historic Landmark.

Some municipalities have preserved sections as town or county canal parks, or have plans to do so. Camillus Erie Canal Park preserves a  stretch and has restored Nine Mile Creek Aqueduct, built in 1841 as part of the First Enlargement of the canal. In some communities, the old canal has refilled with overgrowth and debris. Proposals have been made to rehydrate the old canal through downtown Rochester or Syracuse as a tourist attraction. In Syracuse, the location of the old canal is represented by a reflecting pool in downtown's Clinton Square and the downtown hosts a canal barge and weigh lock structure, now dry. Buffalo's Commercial Slip is the restored and re-watered segment of the canal which formed its "Western Terminus".

In 2004, the administration of New York Governor George Pataki was criticized when officials of New York State Canal Corporation attempted to sell private development rights to large stretches of the Old Erie Canal to a single developer for $30,000, far less than the land was worth on the open market. After an investigation by the Syracuse Post-Standard newspaper, the Pataki administration nullified the deal.

Parks and museums

Parks and museums related to the Old Erie Canal include (listed from east to west):
 Day Peckinpaugh ship; restoration and conversion to a floating museum was planned for completion in 2012 by the New York State Museum
 Watervliet Side Cut Locks, located at Watervliet and listed on the National Register of Historic Places in 1971
 Enlarged Erie Canal Historic District (Discontiguous), a national historic district located at Cohoes, New York listed on the National Register of Historic Places in 2004
 Cohoes Falls Park, 231 N. Mohawk St., Cohoes, New York, offers, looking away from the river, a dramatic view of abandoned and dry Erie Canal lock 18, high above.
 Enlarged Double Lock No. 23, Old Erie Canal, Rotterdam
 Schoharie Crossing State Historic Site at Fort Hunter
 Old Erie Canal State Historic Park, 36-mile linear park from Rome to DeWitt
 Erie Canal Village, near Rome
 Canastota Canal Town Museum, Canastota
 Chittenango Landing Canal Boat Museum, near Chittenango
 Erie Canal Museum in downtown Syracuse
 Camillus Erie Canal Park in Camillus
 Jordan Canal Park in Jordan, town of Elbridge
 Enlarged Double Lock No. 33 Old Erie Canal, St. Johnsville
 Erie Canal Lock 52 Complex, a national historic district located within the Old Erie Canal Heritage Park at Port Byron and Mentz in Cayuga County; listed on the National Register of Historic Places in 1998
 Seneca River Crossing Canals Historic District, a national historic district located at Montezuma and Tyre in Cayuga County; listed on the National Register of Historic Places in 2005
 Centerport Aqueduct Park near Weedsport; listed on the National Register of Historic Places in 2000
 Lock Berlin Park near Clyde
 Macedon Aqueduct Park near Palmyra
 Old Erie Canal Lock 60 Park in Macedon
 Perinton Park in Perinton near Fairport
 Genesee Valley Park in the city of Rochester
 Spencerport Depot & Canal Museum, Spencerport
 Niagara Escarpment "Flight of Five" locks at Lockport
 Erie Canal Discovery Center, 24 Church Street, Lockport (Locks 34 and 35)
 Canalside Buffalo at the Canal's "Western Terminus"

Erie Canalway Trail

Records and research
Records of the planning, funding, design, construction, and administration of the Erie Canal are vast and can be found in the New York State Archives. Except for two years (1827–1829), the State of New York did not require canal boat operators to maintain or submit passenger lists.

Locks

The following list of locks is provided for the current canal, from east to west. There are a total of 36 (35 numbered) locks on the Erie Canal.

Overall sidewall height will vary by lock, ranging between  depending on the lift and navigable stages.

Distance is based on position markers from an interactive canal map provided online by the New York State Canal Corporation and may not exactly match specifications on signs posted along the canal. Mean surface elevations are comprised from a combination of older canal profiles and history books as well as specifications on signs posted along the canal. The margin of error should normally be within .

All surface elevations are approximate.

 Denotes federally managed locks.

There is a  natural rise between locks E33 and E34 as well as a  natural rise between Lock E35 and the Niagara River.

There is no Lock E1 or Lock E31 on the Erie Canal. The place of "Lock E1" on the passage from the lower Hudson River to Lake Erie is taken by the Troy Federal Lock, located just north of Troy, New York, and is not part of the Erie Canal System proper. It is operated by the United States Army Corps of Engineers. The Erie Canal officially begins at the confluence of the Hudson and Mohawk rivers at Waterford, New York.

Although the original alignment of the Erie Canal through Buffalo has been filled in, travel by water is still possible from Buffalo via the Black Rock Lock in the Niagara River to the canal's modern western terminus in Tonawanda, and eastward to Albany. The Black Rock Lock is operated by the United States Army Corps of Engineers.

See also
 Robert C. Dorn
 List of canals in New York
 List of canals in the United States
 "Low Bridge", a song written by Thomas S. Allen, also known as "The Erie Canal Song"
 John C. Mather (New York politician)
 Ohio and Erie Canal, connecting Lake Erie with the Ohio River
 Welland Canal, opened in 1829, bypasses the Niagara River between Lake Erie and Lake Ontario

References

Further reading
 
 
 
 
 
 
 
  
  Online review.

External links

 Erie & Barge Canal: A bibliography by the Buffalo History Museum.
 Erie Canal case study in Transition Times. Archived at Ghostarchive.
 Information and Boater's Guide to the Erie Canal
 Canalway Trail Information
 Historical information (with photos) of the Erie Canal
 Video showing the operations of Lock 22E in 2016.
 New York State Canal Corporation Site
 The Opening of the Erie Canal – An Online Exhibition by CUNY
New York Heritage online exhibit - Two Hundred Years on the Erie Canal
 The Canal Society of New York State
 Digging Clinton's Ditch: The Impact of the Erie Canal on America 1807–1860  Multimedia
 A Glimpse at Clinton's Ditch, 1819–1820 by Richard F. Palmer
 Guide to Canal Records in the New York State Archives
 The Erie Canal Mapping Project
 New York Heritage – Working on the Erie Canal
 Photographs of the Erie Canal Relating to Fort Hunter, N.Y. Ca. 1910 (finding aid) at the New York State Library, accessed May 18, 2016.
 William Jaeger's photography of the Canal remains. Archived at the Wayback Machine
 American Society of Civil Engineers site- The Erie Canal was the world's longest canal and one of America's great engineering feats. 
 
 
 
 
 
 
 
 
 
 
 
 
 Newspaper articles and clippings about the Building of the Erie Canal at Newspapers.com

 
1821 establishments in New York (state)
Canals in New York (state)
Geography of Buffalo, New York
Historic American Buildings Survey in New York (state)
Historic American Engineering Record in New York (state)
Historic Civil Engineering Landmarks
Canals opened in 1825